Advertising World was a magazine started in 1901 by William Berry, 1st Viscount Camrose.

Notes

1901 establishments in the United Kingdom
Business magazines published in the United Kingdom
Defunct magazines published in the United Kingdom
Magazines established in 1901
Magazines with year of disestablishment missing